Keith Murray (born 1974) is an American rapper.

Keith Murray may also refer to:

 Keith Murray (ceramic artist) (1892–1981), designer of pottery, glass, and metalware
 Keith Murray, Baron Murray of Newhaven (1903–1993), British academic
 Keith Murray (rugby union) (born 1962), Scottish international rugby union player
 Keith Murray (born 1977), American lead vocalist for We Are Scientists
 Keith Murray, English officer of arms, see Portcullis Pursuivant